Ajnod railway station is a small railway station in Indore, Madhya Pradesh. Its code is AJN. This railway station is built on the Indore–Fatehabad metre-gauge railway line now broad gauge. The station consists of a single platform. The platform is not well sheltered. It lacks many facilities, including water and sanitation.

Trains

The following trains stops at Ajnod :

79312/79311 Laxmibai Nagar–Ratlam DEMU
79305/79306 Ratlam–Indore DMU

See also

References 

Railway stations in Agar Malwa district
Ujjain
Ratlam railway division
Year of establishment missing